Chit A Mhya may refer to:
 Chit A Mhya (1940 film), a Burmese black-and-white drama film
 Chit A Mhya (1979 film), a Burmese black-and-white drama film